The Haliburton House Museum is part of the Nova Scotia Museum system and is located in Windsor, Nova Scotia.  It was′ built in the 1830s for Thomas Chandler Haliburton, a Windsor native who was one of Canada's first famous authors).  His "Sam Slick" stories won him acclaim around the English-speaking world of the 1840s, and though Haliburton's famous character was fictitious, the home has also been referred to as the "Sam Slick House" informally for many years.  The house was added to during Haliburton's time, but successive owners also made major changes to the house until the 1920s.  In 1939, the province acquired the home and in 1940 opened the site as the Haliburton Memorial Museum.     

Though Haliburton auctioned off the property and the contents of the home when he left for England in 1856, the museum does have some furniture and artifacts that belonged to him, including his writing desk.  Most of these items were procured by donation to the Nova Scotia Museum to coincide with the 1940 opening.  The rest of the museum is furnished in period pieces from the museum's collection.

The Museum is open to the public from June 1 - October 15 every year.

References

External links
 Haliburton House Museum

Museums in Hants County, Nova Scotia
Historic house museums in Nova Scotia
Nova Scotia Museum